The Yngwie Malmsteen Collection is the first compilation album by Yngwie J. Malmsteen. It was released in November 1991.

Track listing

References 

1991 compilation albums
Yngwie Malmsteen compilation albums